This is a list of musical compositions by the Soviet-born 21st-century Austrian-American composer Lera Auerbach. Her oeuvre includes concerti, chorales, operas, piano trios, sonatas, preludes, and symphonies.

Most of her works use the standard opus number system.

By chronology 
All compositions have been compiled by Sikorski in partnership with Boosey and Hawkes.

References 

Lists of compositions by composer